In The City  ( Qaghaqum) is an Armenian comedy drama television series. The series premiered on Shant TV on October 1, 2012.
The series takes place in Yerevan, Armenia.

Series overview
The show is a continuation of the series In The Army, showing the life of the soldiers after they left the army.

Cast and characters

Hayk Petrosyan portrays Narek
Emil Galstyan portrays Hambartzum Hambartzumyan
Vahe Petrosyan portrays Qajik Aslanyan
Hovhannes Davtyan portrays Mkho Arevshatyan
Movses Nikoghosyan portrays Karbit
Hakob Hakobyan portrays Karo 
Diana Grigoryan portrays Iren Arevshatyan
Ara Karagyan portrays Zorik
Levon Muradyan portrays Vram Arevshatyan
Tamara Charkhifalaqyan portrays Margarita Arevshatyan
Anais Sardaryan portrays Anoushik
Tigran Gyulumyan portrays Vrej
Artur Petrosyan portrays Mkrtich
Siranush Esayan portrays Srbuhi
Hamlet Adiyan portrays Rshtun Rshtoyan
Sona Melqonyan portrays Lilith
Sona Matevosyan portrays Sofa
Gor Harutyunyan portrays Varuj Danielyan
Anahit Kirakosyan portrays Susik
Gevorg Manukyan portrays Melo
Sargis Vardanyan portrays Artyom
Armen Miqaelyan portrays Gago
Vahagn Sargsyan portrays Hamo

References

External links
 
 Qaghaqum on Hayojax
 In the City at the Internet Movie Database

Armenian comedy television series
Armenian-language television shows
Shant TV original programming
2012 Armenian television series debuts
2010s Armenian television series